Saskia Elemans (born 11 March 1977 in Nijmegen) is a Dutch professional cyclo-cross racing cyclist.

Career highlights

2002
1st in Boxtel, Cyclo-cross (F) (NED)
2003
2nd in National Championship, Mountainbike, Elite, The Netherlands (F) (NED)
2004
2nd in Eindhoven, Cyclo-cross (F) (NED)
2007
2nd in Moergestel, Cyclo-cross (F) (NED)
2nd in Veghel-Eerde, Cyclo-cross (F) (NED)
2nd in Overijse, Cyclo-cross (F), Overijse (BEL)
3rd in Loenhout, Cyclo-cross (F) (BEL)
2008 (Team Flexpoint)
3rd in National Championship, Cyclo-cross, Elite, The Netherlands (F), Sint Michielsgestel (NED)
1st in Surhuisterveen Centrumcross (F) (NED)

External links

1977 births
Living people
Dutch female cyclists
Cyclo-cross cyclists
Dutch mountain bikers
Sportspeople from Nijmegen
Cyclists from Gelderland